Late Night Restaurant is a 2015 South Korean drama series based on the manga Shinya Shokudō. It aired two back-to-back episodes on SBS on Saturdays at 24:10 and 24:40 from July 4 to September 5, 2015.

Plot
A restaurant opens at midnight until seven in the morning. Its mysterious owner and chef, simply called the 'Master', has no fixed items on his menu, but will take orders from any customer and cook up whatever they ask for. As the Master cooks, his customers tell him their life stories.

Cast
Kim Seung-woo as Master

Regular customers
Choi Jae-sung as Ryu
Nam Tae-hyun as Min-woo
Jung Han-hun as Mr. Kim
Joo Won-sung as "Quack"
Park Joon-myun as Yoo-mi, "Fat woman" 
Ban Min-jung as "Banquet noodles" (Noodle Sisters)
Jang Hee-jung as "Mixed noodles" (Noodle Sisters)
Son Hwa-ryung as "Radish noodles" (Noodle Sisters)
Kang Seo-yeon as Cherry
Son Sang-kyung as "Big guy"

Guest appearances
Shim Hye-jin as Eun-soo (ep 2)
Kang Doo as Jae-hee (ep 3)
Ji Jin-hee as Young-shik (ep 4-5)
Dokgo Young-jae as Gentleman Noh
Oh Ji-ho as Sung-kyun (ep 7)
Nam Ji-hyun as Hye-ri (ep 7)
Lee Young-ha as Musician Noh
Lee Young-beom as Food critic
Jo Dong-hyuk as Yong-ryong
Kang Ye-sol as Mi-young
Han Bo-bae as Ji-hee
 Jo Jae-yoon as Kwang Jo (ep 11)
Seo Woo as Doctor Hyo Jin (ep 12)
Jeon So-min as Cha Hye Jin (ep 13)
 Kim Jung-tae as Director Song (ep 14)
 Lee Si-eon as Tae-soo (ep 16)
Nam Gyu-ri as Mi Kyung (ep 16)
 Kim Roi-ha as Chul-min (ep 18)

Episodes
All episodes are named after a certain form of food, most of them of Korean origin.  
 Seasoned Seaweed and Rice Cakes 
 Buckwheat Pancake
 Mixed, Radish and Banquet Noodles
 Short-Necked Clam Soup (Part 1) 
 Hamburg Steak (Part 2) 
 Steamed Spareribs and Kimchi
 Ginseng Chicken Soup
 Butter Rice 
 Grilled Short Rib Patties 
 Barley-Dried Corvina 
 Marinated Chicken Fried Rice 
 Chinese Plums 
 Canned Whelk  
 Candied Sweet Potato and Spicy Rice Cakes
 Potato Ongshim Seaweed Soup
 Oyster Sauce Mayo Ramen
 Tortilla Half-moon Pizza  
 Grilled Flatfish
 Stone Pot Jangjorim Bibimbap 
 A Fall Gizzard Shad Party

References

External links
Late Night Restaurant official SBS website 

Seoul Broadcasting System television dramas
2015 South Korean television series debuts
Korean-language television shows
2015 South Korean television series endings
South Korean mystery television series
South Korean cooking television series
Television series by RaemongRaein